Qeshlaq-e Hajj Ali Qoli Ayaz (also Romanized as Qeshlāq-e Ḩājj ʿAlī Qolī Āyāz) is a village in Qeshlaq-e Shomali Rural District, in the Central District of Parsabad County, Ardabil Province, Iran. At the 2006 census, its population was 35, in 6 families.

References 

Towns and villages in Parsabad County